Lifestyle Food (stylised as Lifestyle FOOD) is an Australian pay-TV food channel, solely dedicated to food, wine and restaurant society. The channel is a subsidiary of Lifestyle, which runs 24 hours a day on the Foxtel.

On 19 September 2016, Lifestyle refreshed its look which included a new logo.

Programming

Original programming
 Stuart MacGill Uncorked (2007)
 Planet Cake (2012)
 River Cottage Australia (2013-2014 on LifeStyle, 2015-present on LifeStyle Food)
 Hemsley + Hemsley: Healthy & Delicious
 Darren Robertson's Charcoal Kitchen (2014)
 Donna Hay: Basics to Brilliance (2016)

Acquired programming
 Nigella Kitchen
 Jamie at Home
 Bill's Food
 Masterchef
 Come Dine With Me
 Ace of Cakes
 Mary's Kitchen Crush

See also 
 Lifestyle
 Lifestyle You
 Lifestyle Home

References

External links
Official site
Lifestyle Channel
Lifestyle YOU
Lifestyle HOME

Television networks in Australia
Food and drink television
Foxtel
Television channels and stations established in 2004
English-language television stations in Australia